Quintus Titurius Sabinus was one of Caesar's legates during the Gallic Wars.  He is first mentioned in Caesar's campaign against the Remi, in 57 BC. In 56 BC, he was sent by Caesar with three legions against the Venelli, Curiosolitae, and Lexovii (in Normandy), who were led by Viridovix. He gained a great victory over Viridovix's forces, and all the insurgent states submitted to his authority.

In 54 BC he and Lucius Aurunculeius Cotta were stationed for the winter in the territory of the Eburones with a legion and five cohorts. They had not been in the country more than fifteen days before they were attacked by Ambiorix and Cativolcus. Sabinus, showing less resolve than Cotta and trusting himself under Ambiorix's guise of truce and safe passage, evacuated the camp under threat of German attack. As a result, he was massacred along with Cotta and all their troops.

Sources
Caes. B. G. ii. 5, iii. 11, 17—19, v. 24—37
Dion Cass. xxxix. 45, xl. 5, 6
Suet. Caes. 25
Livy EpiL 106
Florus iii. 10
Orosius vi. 10
Eutropius vi. 14

Roman people of the Gallic Wars
Ancient Roman generals
1st-century BC Romans